Grove House School was a Quaker school in Tottenham, United Kingdom.

School
The school was established in 1828 as a boarding school for 75 boys of the Quaker community, initially under Thomas Binns. One of its founders was Josiah Forster, who had attended the Quaker school his grandfather had founded in 1752, Forster's School, also in Tottenham. Its curriculum was advanced for its time, and it did not use corporal punishment. After languishing around 1850, it was enlarged by Arthur Robert Abbott, who admitted non-Quaker boys but after buying the school in 1877, closed it, and took Anglican orders. It was located on the south side of Tottenham Green next to the building of a former Quaker school which had closed some two years before its opening. The site was acquired for Tottenham Polytechnic which became the College of North East London (now the College of Haringey, Enfield and North East London following a merger 
with Enfield College August 2009).

In 1890, the Quakers were to found another school, Leighton Park School, Reading as a direct descendant of Grove House. Following on from Grove House and in recognition of the earlier foundation of the school, the first senior Boarding House at Leighton Park was named Grove House. Grove House is a work by architect Alfred Waterhouse, who had attended the original Grove House School. Many families from Grove House continued the connection and sent their boys to Leighton Park, such as the Cadburys, Foxes, Frys, Backhouses and Hodgkins.

Alumni
Josiah Forster (1782-1870), Headmaster of Grove House School, anti-slavery campaigner
Joseph Pease (railway pioneer) (1799-1872), first Quaker MP permitted to take his seat in parliament
William Henry Leatham (1815-1889), banker and MP
William Edward Forster (1818-1886), Liberal statesman and businessman whose 1870 Act introduced compulsory primary education
John Henry Gurney Sr. (1819-1890), banker, MP and ornithologist
Edmund Backhouse (MP) (1824-1906), MP
Joseph Lister (1827-1912), surgeon
Sir Robert Fowler, 1st Baronet (1828-1891), MP
Alexander Peckover, 1st Baron Peckover (1830-1919), banker
Alfred Waterhouse (1830-1905), architect
Thomas Hodgkin (1831-1913), physician
Edward Burnett Tylor (1832-1917), anthropologist
Joseph Henry Shorthouse (1834-1903), author
Arthur Pease (1837-1898), MP
Rickman Godlee (1849-1925), surgeon
William Leatham Bright (1851-1910), MP
 George Stacey Albright (1855-1945), a director of Albright and Wilson 
Sir Alfred Pease, 2nd Baronet (1857-1939), MP and sportsman
Alfred Emmott, 1st Baron Emmott (1858-1926), MP
John William Wilson (1858-1932), MP
Jack Pease, 1st Baron Gainford (1860-1943), MP and Chairman of the BBC
William Somervell (1860-1934), MP and Chairman of K Shoes
Henry Head (1861-1940), neurosurgeon

References

External links
History of Quaker Education
Tottenham Quaker Meeting (Religious Society of Friends)

Defunct schools in the London Borough of Haringey
Christianity in London
Quaker schools in England
Educational institutions established in 1828
Boys' schools in London
1828 establishments in England
Educational institutions disestablished in 1877
1870s disestablishments in England